Marc LaBelle (born December 20, 1969) is a Canadian former professional ice hockey player.

Career 
LaBelle went undrafted and signed with the Montreal Canadiens in 1991 as a free agent, but played in the minors. He then signed with the Ottawa Senators the next year, again as a free agent, but only played in the minor leagues. LaBelle was then claimed by the Florida Panthers in the 1993 NHL Expansion Draft, spending three seasons in the International Hockey League with the Cincinnati Cyclones and the Milwaukee Admirals, but never played for the Panthers. 

He signed with the Dallas Stars in 1996 and played nine regular season games during the 1996–97 NHL season, scoring no points and collecting 46 penalty minutes. He continued to play in the IHL with the Admirals, Cyclones, and Michigan K-Wings. He also played one game in the Quebec Semi-Pro Hockey League for the Lachute Rapids. LaBelle joined the El Paso Buzzards as a player and associate coach, where he spent two seasons, but suffered a hand injury during a game against the New Mexico Scorpions, which eventually led to his retirement. He briefly came out of retirement during the 2006–07 ECHL season playing one more game for the Cincinnati Cyclones.

External links

1969 births
Canadian ice hockey left wingers
Cincinnati Cyclones (IHL) players
Cincinnati Cyclones (ECHL) players
Dallas Stars players
El Paso Buzzards players
Fredericton Canadiens players
Hull Olympiques players
Ice hockey people from Quebec
Kalamazoo Wings (1974–2000) players
Milwaukee Admirals (IHL) players
New Haven Senators players
Richmond Renegades players
San Diego Gulls (IHL) players
Thunder Bay Thunder Hawks players
Undrafted National Hockey League players
Victoriaville Tigres players
Living people
People from Maniwaki